Bridgefoot is a village in Cumbria, historically part of Cumberland, near the Lake District National Park in England. It is situated at the confluence of the River Marron and Lostrigg Beck, approximately 1 mile south of the River Derwent. To the south it is seamlessly joined with the village of Little Clifton.

Governance
Bridgefoot, is part of the Workington constituency of the UK parliament. The current Member of Parliament is Mark Jenkinson, a member of the Conservative Party. The Labour Party has won the seat in every general election since 1979; the Conservative Party has only been elected once in Workington since the Second World War: in the  1976 Workington by-election.

For the European Parliament residents in Bridgefoot voted to elect MEP's for the North West England constituency before Brexit in 2020.

For Local Government purposes it is in the Dalton Ward of Allerdale Borough Council and the Cockermouth South Division of Cumbria County Council.

Bridgefoot  has its own Parish Council; Greysouthen Parish Council.

References

Villages in Cumbria
Allerdale